Jose Miguel Tuason Arroyo (born June 27, 1945), also known as Mike Arroyo, is a former First Gentleman of the Philippines. A lawyer by profession, he is the husband of former president and house speaker Gloria Macapagal Arroyo. He is the first and, to date, only male spouse of a President of the Philippines and Vice President of the Philippines until Manases Reyes Carpio when Sara Duterte took office as Vice President.

Family and personal life

Arroyo's great-great-grandparents were Ignacio Arroyo and Doña María Pidal, who had three children: Maria Beatriz del Rosario Arroyo (an Ilongga nun who is a candidate for sainthood in the Catholic Church); José María Arroyo; and Mariano Arroyo. José María became a senator in 1919, whilst Mariano was elected governor of Iloilo province in Western Visayas region in 1928. Senator José María Arroyo and his wife, Jesusa Araneta-Lacson of Negros Occidental, produced seven children, one of whom was Ignacio Lacson Arroyo.

The younger Ignacio subsequently married Lourdes Zaragoza Tuason and had two sons and a daughter, Jose Miguel, his brother, Ignacio Arroyo Jr., and sister Maria Lourdes.

Jose Miguel is married to Maria Gloria Macaraeg Macapagal in 1968, and the couple has three children: Juan Miguel ("Mikey"); Evangelina Lourdes ("Luli"); and Diosdado ("Dato"). Luli married former investment banker and director of the Ayala Foundation, J. Aloysius "Luigi" Bernas on November 5, 2008.

Public life

Arroyo's major project whilst occupying the role of the First Gentleman was the sourcing of funds for the training of Filipino athletes in preparation for the 2005 Southeast Asian Games, for which the Philippines was the host nation. Beyond that, not much else is known.

Health
The former First Gentleman's fragile health has been a public affair since April 9, 2007, when he underwent open heart surgery after being diagnosed with an aortic aneurysm. The procedure lasted for ten hours but was considered successful, and 22 days after the operation, Arroyo had almost completely recovered and was discharged from hospital. However, Arroyo's health since 2007 has been described as "questionable", with serious abdominal pains resulting in an emergency landing in 2008, and another heart-related hospital visit in 2010.

Controversies
During the period his wife's rule, Arroyo became the main target of attacks, including those against his wife's administration, and his alleged involvement in a corruption scandal   led him to opt for voluntary exile as a management technique.

Awards and decorations
 Knight Grand Cross of the Order of Isabella the Catholic (Spain, 2007)

Ancestry

Notes

References

1945 births
Ateneo de Manila University alumni
20th-century Filipino lawyers
Living people
People from Negros Occidental
People from Pampanga
First Ladies and First Gentlemen of the Philippines
Visayan people
Filipino Roman Catholics
Hiligaynon people
Araneta family
Jose Miguel
Spouses of presidents of the Philippines